Graham is an unincorporated community located in Carter County, Oklahoma, United States. According to the 2000 U.S. Census it had a population of 158.

History 
A post office was established at Graham, Indian Territory on June 16, 1891.

At the time of its founding, Graham was located in Pickens County, Chickasaw Nation.

References

Towns in Oklahoma
Towns in Carter County, Oklahoma